Melinda Kunhegyi (born December 1, 1965) is a Canadian former competitive pair skater. With her skating partner, Lyndon Johnston, she is the 1981 Prague Skate champion, the 1981 Grand Prix International St. Gervais champion,  and a two-time Canadian national silver medalist. They competed together at the 1984 Winter Olympics.

Personal life 
Kunhegyi was born on December 1, 1965, in Guelph, Ontario, Canada.

Career 
Kunhegyi represented the Preston Figure Skating Club in Cambridge, Ontario.

In 1981, Kunhegyi and Lyndon Johnston won three international medals – silver at the Nebelhorn Trophy, gold at the Prague Skate, and gold at the Grand Prix International St. Gervais. In 1982, they took silver at the St. Ivel International.

During the 1983–1984 season, the pair won bronze at the 1983 Skate America and then silver at the 1984 Canadian Championships. They placed 12th at the 1984 Winter Olympics in Sarajevo, Yugoslavia.

In their final season together, Kunhegyi/Johnston won silver at the Ennia Challenge Cup and Canadian Championships. They placed fifth at the 1985 World Championships in Tokyo, Japan.

Kunhegyi/Johnston won three national titles in four skating, taking gold in 1982, 1984, and 1985.

Results
pairs with Johnston

References

1965 births
Living people
Canadian female pair skaters
Figure skaters at the 1984 Winter Olympics
Olympic figure skaters of Canada
Sportspeople from Guelph